Grand Prix Cycliste de la Ville de Rennes was a professional cycle road race held in Rennes, France until 2008 when it was last organised, with the organisers citing financial difficulties as the reason. Since 2005 the race was organized as a 1.1 event on the UCI Europe Tour, also being part of the Coupe de France de cyclisme sur route.

Winners

External links
 Official site 

UCI Europe Tour races
Cycle races in France
Recurring sporting events established in 1979
1979 establishments in France
Recurring sporting events disestablished in 2008
Defunct cycling races in France
2008 disestablishments in France